Adramann is a village in Nakodar. Nakodar is a city in the district Jalandhar of Indian state of Punjab.

Adramann lies on the Nakodar-Mehatpur road which is almost 3 km from it.  
The nearest railway station to Adramann is Nakodar railway station at a distance of 12 km.

References

External links
Official website of Punjab Govt. with Adramann's details

Villages in Jalandhar district
Villages in Nakodar tehsil